Taekwondo was a demonstration sport at the 1992 Summer Olympics in Barcelona.  It was the second time that the sport was included in the Olympic program; it would become an official sport eight years later at the 2000 Games.  A total of 64 men and 64 women competed in eight different weight classes.  Each event featured a single-elimination tournament to determine the winner.

People
The head coach for the U.S. Olympic Taekwondo team was Dong Keun Park, the former member of the South Korean National Team from 1960 through 1966. He captained the South Korean team for five years with the undefeated record of winning more than 200 competition matches with multiple bouts, and has been inducted into the official Taekwondo Hall of Fame and US Taekwondo Grandmasters Society Hall of Fame.

Medalists

Medal table

Men's events

Finweight (–50 kg)

Flyweight (50–54 kg)

Bantamweight (54–58 kg)

Featherweight (58–64 kg)

Lightweight (64–70 kg)

Welterweight (70–76 kg)

Middleweight (76–83 kg)

Heavyweight (+83 kg)

Women's events

Finweight (–43 kg)

Flyweight (43–47 kg)

Bantamweight (47–51 kg)

Featherweight (51–55 kg)

Lightweight (55–60 kg)

Welterweight (60–65 kg)

Middleweight (65–70 kg)

Heavyweight (+70 kg)

References

Official Olympic Report

1992 Summer Olympics events
1992
Olympic demonstration sports
1992 in taekwondo
Men's events at the 1992 Summer Olympics
Women's events at the 1992 Summer Olympics